Natalie Blais is an American politician. She is the State Representative for the 1st Franklin District of Massachusetts, which covers an area of 511.3 square miles. She was elected in 2018 following the retirement of Stephen Kulik. Blais is a member of the Democratic Party.

See also
 2019–2020 Massachusetts legislature
 2021–2022 Massachusetts legislature

References

Democratic Party members of the Massachusetts House of Representatives
Living people
Women state legislators in Massachusetts
Year of birth missing (living people)
21st-century American politicians
21st-century American women politicians